Karen Kijewski (pronounced key-EFF-ski) (born 1943) is an American writer of mystery novels, known for her Kat Colorado series.

Biography
Kijewski was born in Berkeley, California, the daughter of University of California, Berkeley professor Clarence Glacken, and received B.A. and M.A. degrees from UC-Berkeley. She was a high school English teacher in Massachusetts for almost a decade before dedicating herself to writing. A resident of Sacramento, California, she made a living tending a bar while establishing herself as a novelist.

Kijewski is married and has two daughters.

Bibliography
Katwalk (St. Martin's, 1989). 
Katapult (St. Martin's, 1990). 
Kat's Cradle (Doubleday, 1992). 
Copy Kat (Doubleday, 1992). 
Wild Kat (Doubleday, 1994). 
Alley Kat Blues (Doubleday, 1995). 
Honky Tonk Kat (G.P. Putnam, 1996). 
Kat Scratch Fever (G.P. Putnam, 1997). 
Stray Kat Waltz (G.P. Putnam, 1998).

Awards
Kijewski's first novel, Katwalk, received a mixed reception from reviewers; however it also won the 1990 Anthony Award and the Shamus Award the same year, both for "Best First Novel".

References

1943 births
Living people
20th-century American novelists
American mystery writers
American women novelists
Writers from Sacramento, California
Writers from Berkeley, California
University of California, Berkeley alumni
Anthony Award winners
Shamus Award winners
Women mystery writers
20th-century American women writers
21st-century American novelists
21st-century American women writers